Lucy Moore (born 1970) is a British-born historian and writer.

Biography
Moore was educated in Britain and the United States and studied history at the University of Edinburgh. She appeared in The Supersizers Eat... the Roaring Twenties in 2009 alongside Sue Perkins and Giles Coren, and in a BBC documentary Glamour's Golden Age in 2013.

Bibliography 
Con Men and Cutpurses: Scenes from the Hogarthian Underworld
The Thieves Opera: The Remarkable Lives and Deaths of Jonathan Wild, Thief-Taker and Jack Sheppard, House-Breaker (1996)
Amphibious Thing: The Life of a Georgian Rake (2000)
Maharanis: The Lives and Times of Three Generations of Indian Princesses (2004) (Chimnabai, Maharani of Baroda; Sunity, Maharani of Cooch Behar; Indira Devi, Maharani of Cooch Behar; Gayatri Devi, Maharani of Jaipur)
Maharanis (2005)
Liberty: The Lives and Times of Six Women in Revolutionary France (2007)  	
Anything Goes: A Biography of the Roaring Twenties (November 2008)
Nijinsky: a Life (2013)

References

British historians
1970 births
Living people
Alumni of the University of Edinburgh
British women historians